Babilonas is a shopping and entertainment mall in Panevėžys, Lithuania (Klaipėdos street 143a). It is a part of a wider Babilonas real estate development.

Shops and entertainment businesses
In the shopping mall there are:

Three restaurants and a cafeteria.
Cinema (Apollo Babilonas, 3 cinema halls).
Separate hall for furniture sales.
Electronics store (Topo centras).
Chinese goods store (Azijos centras).
Various other stores and entertainment places (up to ): clothes, sports and lifestyle, drinks, books.

Furniture retail hall, cinema and the electronics store are the largest in northeastern Lithuania (Aukštaitija).

History

The construction of the shopping mall started in 2006 and ended in 2007.

In the August 2008 the mall was expanded: the cinema and several additional shops were opened.

In 2007-2008 the primary market catered by the mall was that of household goods: furniture, construction, interior décor. Other primary target market was that for entertainment (cinema, ice rink).

Since year 2009 the market orientation changed: the number of interior goods stores lowered somewhat and at the same time number of stores selling soft goods such as clothing and shoes. In 2010 a supermarket (food store) opened for the first time in Babilonas.

Image and architecture

As the name "Babilonas" means Babylon, the interior of Babilonas is modeled after the ancient Middle East. On the walls over the shop entrances there are frescoes with bulls and ancient people. In front of main entrance there are improvised columns. Inside a shopping center in a special terrarium a crocodile, named by children Babilonijus, lived for several years.

References

Shopping malls in Panevėžys
Commercial buildings completed in 2007